Sujitra Ekmongkolpaisarn (born 17 June 1977) is a former Thai badminton player. She competed at the 2000 Summer Olympics in Sydney, Australia in the women's singles and doubles event. Ekmongkolpaisarn was the bronze medalists at the 1998 Asian Games in the women's team event, 2002 Asian Games in the singles event, and at the 1999 Asian Championships in the doubles event. She reached a career high ranking of World No. 5.

In 2017, Ekmongkolpaisarn announced about her marriage plan with a woman Viraradis Tippadabhorn, which she had dating for three and a half years.

Achievements

Asian Games 
Women's singles

Asian Championships 
Women's doubles

Southeast Asian Games 
Women's singles

Women's doubles

Mixed doubles

IBF World Grand Prix
The World Badminton Grand Prix sanctioned by International Badminton Federation (IBF) since 1983.

Women's singles

Women's doubles

IBF International
Women's singles

Women's doubles

Mixed doubles

References

External links
 
 

1977 births
Living people
Sujitra Ekmongkolpaisarn
Sujitra Ekmongkolpaisarn
Badminton players at the 2000 Summer Olympics
Sujitra Ekmongkolpaisarn
Badminton players at the 1994 Asian Games
Badminton players at the 1998 Asian Games
Badminton players at the 2002 Asian Games
Sujitra Ekmongkolpaisarn
Asian Games medalists in badminton
Medalists at the 1998 Asian Games
Medalists at the 2002 Asian Games
Competitors at the 1995 Southeast Asian Games
Competitors at the 1999 Southeast Asian Games
Competitors at the 2001 Southeast Asian Games
Competitors at the 2005 Southeast Asian Games
Sujitra Ekmongkolpaisarn
Sujitra Ekmongkolpaisarn
Sujitra Ekmongkolpaisarn
Southeast Asian Games medalists in badminton
Sujitra Ekmongkolpaisarn
Lesbian sportswomen
LGBT badminton players
Sujitra Ekmongkolpaisarn
Sujitra Ekmongkolpaisarn